William Gayraud-Hirigoyen (1 May 1898 – 9 December 1962) was a French athlete who competed in rugby union in the late 1910s and early 1920s, then moved to bobsleigh and skeleton in the late 1940s.

In rugby, Hirigoyen played in the Five Nations Championship (Six Nations Championship since 2000) in 1919–20, scoring one try in the event. He played in the Hooker position during his career. Hirigoyen would later serve as a sports official in rugby during the 1920s.

Hirigoyen later competed in bobsleigh and skeleton from the mid-1920s to the late 1940s. He won a bronze medal in the four-man bobsleigh event at the 1947 FIBT World Championships in St. Moritz. The following year, he finished last among thirteen competitors in the men's skeleton event at the 1948 Winter Olympics in St. Moritz. At those same games, Hirigoyen also finished 12th in the two-man event.

References
1948 bobsleigh two-man results
1948 men's skeleton results
Bobsleigh four-man world championship medalists since 1930
Gayraud profile 
Scrum.com profile

1898 births
1962 deaths
Bobsledders at the 1948 Winter Olympics
French male bobsledders
French rugby union players
French male skeleton racers
Skeleton racers at the 1948 Winter Olympics
Olympic bobsledders of France
Olympic skeleton racers of France
19th-century French people
20th-century French people